Rebecca of Sunnybrook Farm is a classic American children's novel by Kate Douglas Wiggin.

Rebecca of Sunnybrook Farm may also refer to:

 Rebecca of Sunnybrook Farm (play), an American play in 1909 based on the novel
 Rebecca of Sunnybrook Farm (1917 film), a silent comedy-drama film directed by Marshall Neilan
 Rebecca of Sunnybrook Farm (1932 film), a 1932 film directed by Alfred Santell
 Rebecca of Sunnybrook Farm (1938 film), a 1938 musical film directed by Allan Dwan and starring Shirley Temple
 Rebecca of Sunnybrook Farm (1978), a 1978 TV series